Ceno2 (born in 1986 as Mohammad Azlan Ramlan) is a Singaporean graffiti fine artist. He is one of few household names in the Singaporean street-art scene.

Career 
Ceno2 started drawing at a young age before moving on to oil painting. His interest in graffiti started about 11 years old when his father painted a Mickey Mouse mural in his room. After his GCE O level, he studied Western painting at Nanyang Academy of Fine Arts (Nafa). His first break came at 18, when he was invited by Popular Bookstore to paint at its Bras Basah Complex branch. He pursued graffiti full time after completing his national service.

In the media 
In 2017, Ceno2 was featured in the Channel NewsAsia series, Unusual Suspects: The Outsiders, about Singaporeans who are not household names but are known in other countries.

References

External links 
 

1986 births
Singaporean graffiti artists
Living people
Nanyang Academy of Fine Arts alumni